Tom Fitzsimmons (born October 28, 1947) is an American television actor. He is known for playing Franklin Ford III in the American drama television series The Paper Chase.

Born in San Francisco, California. Fitzsimmons attended at the Fairfield College Preparatory School. He then attended at Yale University, where he earned his Master of Fine Arts degree. After earning his degree, Fitzsimmons made his theatre debut in the Broadway play Scapino. He began his television career in 1974, where he first appeared in the soap opera television series Love of Life, where Fitzsimmons played Price Madden. Fitzsimmons guest-starred in television programs including The Bob Newhart Show, One Day at a Time, Baa Baa Black Sheep, Dallas, Murder, She Wrote and All in the Family.

In 1978, Fitzsimmons joined the cast of the new CBS drama television series The Paper Chase, where he played Franklin Ford III. In 1980, he had an audition having his hair curled, in which according to The Republic he was a model. He played Dr. Meeker in All My Children. His last credit was from the legal drama and police procedural television series Law & Order.

Personal life
He is openly gay, and he lives with his partner, actor Tim Donoghue, in Roxbury, Connecticut.

References

External links 

Tom Fitzsimmons at Rotten Tomatoes

1947 births
Living people
Male actors from San Francisco
Male actors from California
American male television actors
American male soap opera actors
20th-century American male actors
Fairfield College Preparatory School alumni
Yale University alumni
American models